Rye House in Hoddesdon, Hertfordshire is a former fortified manor house, located in what is now the Lee Valley Regional Park. The gatehouse is the only surviving part of the structure and is a Grade I listed building. The house gave its name to the Rye House Plot, an assassination attempt of 1683 that was a violent consequence of the Exclusion Crisis in British politics at the end of the 1670s.

History
The ownership of Rye House was very stable over four centuries; but the fabric gradually ran down, and the buildings diminished.

Foundation
Andres Pedersen, a Danish soldier who took part in the Hundred Years' War, was denizenised in England in 1433, becoming Sir Andrew Ogard. In 1443 he was allowed to impark part of the manor of Rye, the area then called the Isle of Rye, in the parish of Stanstead Abbots, and was given licence to crenellate what became Rye House. Over 50 types of moulded brick were used in its construction.

Early Modern period
In 1517 William Parr was living at Rye House; it was the main family home for the Parrs, Catherine Parr and Anne Parr also, after their father's death, until 1531. It passed in 1577 to Joyce Frankland from her husband William. The Frankland family sold it to the Baeshe family, in 1619.

It was later the setting of the Rye House Plot. In 1683, when the putative plot was actively being discussed, it was occupied by Richard Rumbold, one of the conspirators. It was bought by the Fieldes family in 1676, in the person of the Hertford MP Edmund Feilde (or Field). A short film was made about the Rye House Plot in the late 1920s.

From the 19th century
By 1834 Rye House had become a workhouse. Subsequently (William) Henry Teale developed it into a tourist attraction, buying the House and 50 acres in 1864. There were a maze and a bowling green, among other features. An affray there in 1885 between Catholic excursionists and Orangemen led to a question in the House of Commons. In 1911 it was described as a hotel. For many years the Great Bed of Ware was on display.

The moat was put to uses including growing water cress. The part that had been filled in was excavated in the 1980s.

Geography
The local geography played a significant part in the history of the House. At Hoddesdon the River Stort runs into the River Lea, and the area was often flooded. The lord of the manor of Rye maintained a bridge over the Lea, and a causeway. The causeway became part of the coaching road via Bishop's Stortford into East Anglia.

References

External links

Gatehouse page

Parr family
Tudor England
Houses in Hertfordshire
Grade I listed buildings in Hertfordshire
Grade I listed houses
Lee Valley Park
Hoddesdon
 
Country houses in Hertfordshire
Scheduled monuments in Hertfordshire